The monotypic genus Lagenias is endemic to the Cape Province of South Africa 
. It belongs to the tribe Exaceae of the Gentianaceae.

Species
 Lagenias pusillus E. Mey.

References

Monotypic Gentianales genera
Flora of Southern Africa
Gentianaceae
Gentianaceae genera